La Boda is a 1964 Argentine film directed by Lucas Demare from the novel by :es:Ángel María de Lera. It depicts Luciano, a middle-aged social outcast who has made his fortune in the slave trade, and his efforts to woo the young and beautiful Iluminades and win over her parents and other townspeople with his money.

Cast
Manuel Alexandre 
Mercedes Barranco
Conchita Bautista

References

External links
 

1964 films
1960s Spanish-language films
Argentine black-and-white films
Films directed by Lucas Demare
Argentine drama films
1960s Argentine films